Žabljak is a village in Croatia, located  from Barilović.

References

Populated places in Karlovac County